Let's Cheers to This is the second studio album by American rock band Sleeping with Sirens. The album is the first to feature guitarists Jesse Lawson and Jack Fowler.

Production
Recording took place at Interlace Audio in Portland, Oregon. Sessions were co-produced by Kris Crummett, who also served as the engineer, and the band. Crummett provided additional instrumentation, specifically percussion, electronics, piano and strings, before mixing and mastering the recordings.

Composition
"Do It Now Remember It Later" is about people who stand in the way of others' dreams. For the band, this refers to critics and people they work with. "If You Can't Hang" is about three different relationships and the lessons learned from them. Quinn came up with the pre-chorus while waiting before a show in San Francisco, with the rest of the song following shortly after. "Who Are You Now" talks about hope and self-reflection. "Four Corners and Two Sides" discuss faith and where a person stands with it. Quinn came up with "A Trophy Father's Trophy Son" while thinking about divorce and how it affects the parent's children. It is written from the perspective of a son to a father.

Guitarist Jack Fowler showed the rest of the band a riff, which later became "Fire". It talks about a drive people have inside themselves, and the knowledge that what we do could consumes us. "Tally It Up: Settle the Score" was the first song written for the album. The band were apprehensive about including "Your Nickel Ain't Like My Dime", but, according to Quinn, "it has a vibe that not many bands can pull off in our scene." Quinn and guitarist Jesse Lawson wrote "All My Heart" acoustically, and decided to include it as-is on the album. Quinn titled the last track "Let's Cheers to This" after his stepson's enthusiasm for New Years Day. He added that it, along with the album, is a "cheers to triumph, hard times, success, and to life itself."

Release
On March 30, 2011, Let's Cheers to This was announced for release in May. The album's artwork and track listing was revealed. In March and April, the group supported Of Mice & Men on the Artery Foundation Across The Nation Tour in the US. On April 7, "Do It Now Remember It Later" was made available for streaming, before being released as a single the following day. Let's Cheers to This was released on May 10 through Rise Records. The album's working title was "Who Are You Now?", being named after a Christian moral, but it was renamed due to the album not having any religious attributes. Later that month, the band made an appearance at Bled Fest. On July 10, the group filmed a music video for "If You Can't Hang" in Ohio. In July and August, the group participated in the All Stars Tour in the US. The "If You Can't Hang" music video was released on September 22. In September and October, the group supported A Skylit Drive on their headlining European tour.

In October and November, the group supported Alesana on the Rock Yourself to Sleep tour in the US. On November 15, the group posted that they were filming a music video for "Do It Now Remember It Later". In November and December, the group supported We Came as Romans on the Take a Picture, It Will Last Longer tour in the US. In January and February 2012, the group supported Attack Attack! on their US tour. On February 28, the music video for "Do It Now Remember It Later" was premiered via Alternative Press. In March and April, the group went on a headlining US tour with main support from Abandon All Ships and Secrets. They were also supported on the first half of the tour by Lions Lions, with Conditions supporting the second half. Between June and August, the group performed on the Warped Tour. In October and November, the band supported Pierce the Veil on their Collide with the Sky Tour in the US.

Track listing
Track listing per booklet.

Personnel
Personnel per booklet.

Sleeping with Sirens
 Kellin Quinn – lead vocals
 Jesse Lawson – rhythm guitar, backing vocals
 Justin Hills – bass guitar, backing vocals
 Gabe Barham – drums
 Jack Fowler  – lead guitar

Additional musicians
 Kris Crummett – percussion, electronics, piano, strings

Production
 Kris Crummett – producer, engineer, mixing, mastering
 Sleeping with Sirens – producer
 Invisible Creature, Inc. – art direction
 Ryan Clark – design

Charts

References

External links

Let's Cheers to This at YouTube (streamed copy where licensed)

2011 albums
Sleeping with Sirens albums
Rise Records albums
Albums produced by Kris Crummett